Helen Rachel Daly (born 26 May 1976) is a New Zealand former cricketer who played as a left-arm medium bowler. She appeared in 1 Test match and 3 One Day Internationals for New Zealand between 1996 and 1997. She played domestic cricket for North Harbour, Central Districts and Canterbury.

References

External links

1976 births
Living people
Cricketers from Hamilton, New Zealand
New Zealand women cricketers
New Zealand women Test cricketers
New Zealand women One Day International cricketers
North Harbour women cricketers
Central Districts Hinds cricketers
Canterbury Magicians cricketers